Aziz Bagh is a historic residence in Hyderabad, India formerly owned by the scholar and senior civil servant  Dr Hasanuddin Ahmed, IAS. It was built in 1899 by the Persian and Urdu scholar and poet Aziz Jung Bahadur. In 1997 it was given a Cultural Heritage Award by INTACH, the Indian National Trust for Art and Cultural Heritage.

The Aziz Bagh main building is currently owned and occupied by Aziz Jung's two great-grandsons, Shamshuddin Ahmad and Zaheer Uddin Ahmed. Link to Aziz Bagh website; Aziz Bagh, http://www.azizbagh.com] as Aziz Jung's direct descendants, they are the 5th generation owners and residents born and raised at Aziz Bagh. Their children and grandchildren are 6th and 7th generation respectively.

This magnificent heritage building is the pride of Hyderabad. Zaheer U. Ahmed currently lives in Naperville, USA and regularly comes back home. He has written a book called, “Aziz Bagh, Heritage Of Culture”, published by Amazon.

Aziz Bagh is a landmark in the Noorkhan Bazar area of the Old City area of Hyderabad.

Its south-facing facade includes a portico with Ionic columns and also shows Gothic Revival influences. The interior features polished marble flooring and a collection of Deccani-Islamic heirlooms. The property and surrounding compound cover around 3 acres.

In 2013 it was designated a heritage structure by Hyderabad's Municipal Administration and Urban Development (MA&UD) agency, along with 14 other structures, upon recommendation by the Heritage Conservation Commission of the Hyderabad Metropolitan Development Authority.

References

Buildings and structures in Hyderabad, India
1899 establishments in India
Residential buildings in India